Gaby Sylvia (March 24, 1920 – July 26, 1980) was an Italian actress who appeared in many French films and television series.

Partial filmography

 Le ruisseau (1938) - Denise
 Behind the Façade (1939) - Madeleine Martin
 Face au destin (1940) - Madeleine Clairvoix
 First Ball (1941) - Danielle Noblet
 Signé illisible (1942) - Monique Lavergne
 Bonsoir mesdames, bonsoir messieurs (1944) - Micheline Tessier
 La femme fatale (1946) - Claire Coussol
 The Marriage of Ramuntcho (1947) - Maritchu
 Captain Blomet (1947) - Micheline de Mandane
 Métier de fous (1948) - Sylvia Dormont
 Fantasmi del mare (1948) - Elena
 Mission in Tangier (1949) - Lily
 Amour et compagnie (1950) - Danielle Lecourtoy
 Les femmes sont folles (1950) - Marguerite
 The Straw Lover (1951) - Gisèle Sarrazin de Fontenoy
 Avalanche (1951) - Wanda Bouchard
 Huis clos (1954) - Estelle Rigault- une infanticide
 Bad Liaisons (1955) - Hélène Ducouret
 It's All Adam's Fault (1958) - Hélène de Bergen
 La bête à l'affût (1959) - Gilberte
 Méfiez-vous, mesdames (1963) - Florence Moulin
 Beau Masque (1972) - Emilie
 Pardon Mon Affaire, Too! (1977) - Marie-Christine Bosquet, Daniel's director

References

Bibliography
 Goble, Alan. The Complete Index to Literary Sources in Film. Walter de Gruyter, 1999.

External links

1920 births
1980 deaths
Italian film actresses
French film actresses
People from Cesena
Italian emigrants to France
20th-century Italian actresses
20th-century French women
Signatories of the 1971 Manifesto of the 343